Lalitha is a 1976 Indian Tamil-language drama film, written and directed by Valampuri Somanathan. Starring Sujatha in the title role, the film has Gemini Ganesan and Kamal Haasan and Sumithra playing other pivotal roles. It is a remake of the Bengali film Saat Pake Bandha (1963).

Plot 
A rich woman named Lalitha loves and marries a professor Shankar. Since he is at a very low status compared to her family, Lalitha's mother continuously humiliates them on various occasions. Lalitha, on a day, separates from her husband, following an argument about her mother's deeds. Days after, when she decides to reunite with her husband, he has moved far away from there. The rest of the story deals with how they both reunite after a long period.

Cast 
 Gemini Ganesan as Shankar
 Sujatha as Lalitha
 Kamal Haasan as Balu
 Sumithra as Vaani
 Pandari Bai as Shankar's Aunt
 N. Viswanathan as Lalitha's father
 Sukumari as Meenakshi, Lalitha's mother
 Thangavelu as Vaani's father
 Thengai Srinivasan

Production 
Lalitha was directed by Valampuri Somanathan, and produced under production banner Girnar Films.

Soundtrack 
All the lyrics were penned by Kannadasan and music was scored by M. S. Viswanathan.

Reception
Kanthan of Kalki called Lalitha an old-age family story with many heartwarming scenes and concluded the film has neither innovation nor revolution.

References

Bibliography

External links 
 

1970s Tamil-language films
1976 films
Indian drama films
Films scored by M. S. Viswanathan
Tamil remakes of Bengali films
Films based on works by Ashutosh Mukhopadhyay